Gil Muntadas Camprubí (born 25 September 1993), simply known as Gil, is a Spanish footballer who plays for UE Cornellà as a central midfielder.

Club career
Born in Vic, Barcelona, Catalonia, Gil played youth football with RCD Espanyol, and joined Sevilla FC on 10 July 2012, being immediately assigned to the C-team in Tercera División. In the 2013 summer he was promoted to the reserves, in Segunda División B.

On 11 July 2014 Gil moved abroad for the first time in his career, joining Italian Lega Pro side San Marino Calcio. He made his professional debut on 30 August, starting and scoring the first in a 1–1 home draw against A.C. Prato.

On 8 January 2015 Gil and compatriot Albert Miravent rescinded his link with the club. Both returned to their home country and signed for fourth level's CF Pobla de Mafumet seven days later.

References

External links

1993 births
Living people
Footballers from Vic
Spanish footballers
Association football midfielders
Primera Federación players
Segunda División B players
Tercera División players
Sevilla FC C players
Sevilla Atlético players
CF Pobla de Mafumet footballers
UE Figueres footballers
UE Costa Brava players
UE Cornellà players
Serie C players
A.S.D. Victor San Marino players
Spanish expatriate footballers
Spanish expatriate sportspeople in Italy
Expatriate footballers in Italy